The 2001 European Baseball Championship was held in Germany and won by the Netherlands. The main venue was the Baseball Stadium Rheinaue in Bonn, secondary venues were in Cologne and Solingen.

Standings

European Baseball Championship
European Baseball Championship
2001
2001 in German sport